The Medway SLA100 Executive, also called the Medway SLA 100 Executive, is a British ultralight aircraft designed and produced by Medway Microlights, of Rochester, Kent. The aircraft is supplied as a kit for amateur construction or as a complete ready-to-fly-aircraft.

Design and development
The aircraft was designed to comply with the British BCAR Section "S" and the Fédération Aéronautique Internationale microlight rules. It features a strut-braced high-wing, a two-seats-in-side-by-side configuration enclosed cockpit, fixed tricycle landing gear and a single engine in tractor configuration.

The SLA100 is made from bolted-together aluminium tubing, with its flying surfaces covered in Dacron sailcloth. Standard engines available are the  Rotax 912UL and the  Rotax 912ULS four-stroke powerplants.

The SA100 has been certified to the UK BCAR Section "S" standard.

Variants
SLA100 Executive
Standard model with a  wing span
SLA100 Clipper
Clipped wing model, introduced in 2010 and still under development in 2015.

Specifications (SLA100 Executive)

References

External links

2000s British ultralight aircraft
Homebuilt aircraft
Single-engined tractor aircraft
High-wing aircraft